A , literally translating into "small or short tachi (sword)", is one of the traditionally made Japanese swords (nihontō) used by the samurai class of feudal Japan. Kodachi are from the early Kamakura period (1185–1333) and are in the shape of a tachi. Kodachi are mounted in tachi style, but with a length of less than 60 cm. They are often confused with wakizashi, due to their length and handling techniques. However, their construction is what sets the two apart, as kodachi are a set length while wakizashi are forged to complement the wielder's height or the length of their katana. As a result, the kodachi was too short to be called a sword properly but was also too long to be considered a dagger, thus it is widely considered a primary short sword, unlike the tantō or the wakizashi which would act as a secondary weapon that was used alongside a longer blade.

The exact use of the kodachi is unknown; it may have been a companion sword to normal sized tachi or it may have been a sword for an adolescent. Kodachi appear to have been produced only in a certain time period by specific schools of swordmakers.

See also
 List of daggers
 Types of swords
 Tsurugi

References

External weapons 
 

Japanese sword types
Kamakura period